Accident is a 2008 Indian Kannada language Suspense Thriller film directed by Ramesh Aravind and starring himself. Rekha Vedavyas appears in a pivotal role. The supporting cast features Pooja Gandhi, Thilak Shekar and Mohan Shankar.

Synopsis
The movie is a contemporary take on the life of a couple and their journey through time and how they have to fight the eternal battle of good over evil and how they win with support from a set of dear friends. The protagonist of the film is Sawanth (Ramesh Aravind), a radio jockey. His wife is a teacher and a social worker. On returning from a three-week foreign trip, he is shocked to discover that his wife and her co-worker had died in an accident. Sawanth cannot convince himself this is merely an accident and commences an investigation. It is one of the most critically acclaimed films of the decade in Kannada cinema.

Cast 

 Ramesh Aravind as Sawanth
 Rekha Vedavyas as Vasundhara
 Pooja Gandhi as Pooja
 Mohan
 Thilak Shekar as Gowda (credited as Thilak)
 Sudha Rani as Suguna Shankar
 H. G. Dattatreya
 Roshan
 Deepa Iyer
 Pushpa
 Veena
 Master Krishna Dheemanth
 Baby Varsha
 Baby Vidya
 Baby Sushma
 Baby Anagha
 Baby Namratha
 Dinesh Babu
 Rajendra Karanth
 Balaji (credited as Bala)
 Mahesh Kumar (credited as Dr. "Longa" Mahesh)
 Pathi Iyer as Bhushan
 Rachana Maurya appears in an item song.
 Kiran
 Gym Bhaskar

Soundtrack

Ricky Kej composed the film's background score and music for the soundtracks. The album consists of eight soundtracks.

References

External links

2008 films
2000s Kannada-language films
2008 thriller films
Indian thriller films
Films directed by Ramesh Aravind